Evan Ma (born November 2, 1992) is a Canadian actor, singer and rapper. He is a member of the Taiwanese boyband SpeXial since 2014.

Biography 
Ma Zhenhuan was born in Taipei, Taiwan on November 2, 1992. His parents emigrated to Vancouver, Canada, when he was two and a half years old. In 2012, he won the Sunshine Nation contest. In 2013, he moved to Taipei after being recruited by the agency Comic International Productions, where he began to work as a musician.

On May 26, 2014, he joined the Taiwanese boy band SpeXial alongside two other new members. He debuted in SpeXial under its English name of "Evan" on June 5, during the press conference of the group's second album, Break It Down. In the group he is one of the lead vocalists and rappers.

In August 2014, Ma returned to Canada in order to finish his studies at the University of British Columbia, where he graduated from the finance department. Due to this, he was absent during the recording and release of the band's first extended play, Love Killah, which was released on February 4, 2015. He rejoined SpeXial on May 31, 2015, during the Hito Music Awards ceremony. As an actor, he is best known for his roles in web series like Moon River, The Ultimate Ranger, Men with Sword, K.O.3an Guo and K.O. Re:Call.

Filmography

Television

Web series

References

External links 
 Official web site

1992 births
Living people
Taiwanese male television actors
21st-century Taiwanese male actors
21st-century Taiwanese male  singers
Taiwanese pop singers
Taiwanese idols